The National Alpini Association is an Italian association representing the "Alpini in congedo" (Alpini on leave) of the Italian Army. The Alpini are a mountain infantry corps of the Italian Army, that distinguished itself in combat during World War I and World War II.
As the ANA defines itself a quick reaction reserve corps to the active Alpini units, it has been nicknamed 10th Alpini Regiment. Accordingly, the Italian Army never had a 10th Alpini Regiment.

Coin
In March 2020 San Marino will issue a €10 coin commemorating the "93rd national Alpini assembly Rimini".

External links
 Associazione Nazionale Alpini Homepage
 coin-database site

Italian veterans' organisations
Italian Army
Organizations established in 1919